Mankundu railway station  is a  Kolkata Suburban Railway  station on the Howrah–Bardhaman main line. It is located in Hooghly district in the Indian state of West Bengal. It is under the jurisdiction of Eastern Railway zone. Mankundu railway station is a small railway stations of Howrah railway division. It serves Mankundu and surrounding areas. It is 30 km. from Howrah Station.

History
East Indian Railway Company started construction of a line out of Howrah for the proposed link with Delhi via Rajmahal and Mirzapur in 1851.

The first passenger train in eastern India ran from Howrah to Hooghly on 15 August 1854. The track was extended to Raniganj by 1855.

Electrification
Electrification of Howrah—Burdwan main line was completed with 25 kV AC overhead system in 1958.

References

Railway stations in Hooghly district
Howrah railway division
Kolkata Suburban Railway stations
Railway stations in India opened in 1854
1854 establishments in India